Micropercops is a genus of freshwater sleepers native to eastern Asia.

Species
There are currently four recognized species in this genus:
 Micropercops borealis Nichols, 1930
 Micropercops cinctus (Dabry de Thiersant, 1872)
 Micropercops dabryi Fowler & B. A. Bean, 1920
 Micropercops swinhonis (Günther, 1873)

References

Odontobutidae